The 1927 Lafayette Leopards football team was an American football team that represented Lafayette College as an independent during the 1927 college football season. In its fourth season under head coach Herb McCracken, the team compiled a 5–3–1 record. Harold Cothran and William Atkinson were the team captains.  The team played its home games at Fisher Field in Easton, Pennsylvania.

Schedule

References

Lafayette
Lafayette Leopards football seasons
Lafayette Leopards football